Whoop Dee Doo is the sixth studio album by American punk rock band The Muffs and their final album to be released in Kim Shattuck’s lifetime. It was released in July 2014 under Burger Records. Ten years had elapsed since The Muffs' previous album Really Really Happy was released. The album received positive reviews.

Track listing

Personnel

The Muffs
Kim Shattuck - composition, engineer, guitar, photography, producer, lead vocals
Ronnie Barnett - bass, lead vocals
Roy McDonald - drums, percussion

Other personnel
Pat Broderick - design
Tommi Cahill - photography
Evan Frankfort - mixing
Kristian Hoffman - keyboard
Steve Holroyd - engineer
Kristen Shattuck - backing vocals
Keith Slettedahl - backing vocals
Brad Vance - mastering
Martin Wong - photography

References

2014 albums
The Muffs albums